Magic Johnson Enterprises is an American investment company owned by retired NBA Hall of Fame legend Magic Johnson. In 1995, after some criticism that he only invested with other people's money, Johnson took an equity stake along with what was then the Loews chain in the 12-screen multiplex movie theater in Baldwin Hills (now owned by Cinemark). The Beverly Hills–based Magic Johnson Enterprises formerly owned Magic Johnson Theatres in four cities, 31 Burger King restaurants in the Southeast, and 13 24-Hour Fitness/Magic Johnson Sport health clubs. Over the years, Magic Johnson Enterprises has continually invested ownership in many lucrative businesses such as the Los Angeles Lakers, movie theaters and restaurants in the United States, including T.G.I. Friday's, Sodexo, and Burger King locations.

In March 2008, Johnson signed a multi-year marketing deal to help electronics retailer Best Buy Co. bolster sales in urban neighborhoods. In October 2010, Johnson sold his interest in 105 Starbucks licenses back to the company. The next day he sold his 4% interest in the Los Angeles Lakers for an estimated $27 million to Patrick Soon-Shiong.

Johnson's urban investments were formed in 2001 as the Canyon-Johnson Urban Fund, an alliance with Canyon Capital. The alliance has financed 31 real estate developments in 13 states and the District Of Columbia. The first Canyon-Johnson Urban Fund struggled for two years to raise $300 million to invest in urban neighborhoods. A subsequent fund raised $600 million while the third and biggest investment fund was started in April 2008 and drew $1 billion from pension funds and other investors.  The Canyon-Johnson fund was involved in the $100-million purchase of the 32-story former Transamerica Center complex in downtown Los Angeles that subsequently was renovated and sold for $205 million. The fund also had a stake in Sunset+Vine in Hollywood, which was built for $125 million and sold for $160 million.

In the summer of 2006, the company made headlines for concluding a deal with Sodexo, one of the largest food services and facilities management companies in the world. The initiative includes a marketing agreement and the formation of SodexoMAGIC, LLC, a new joint venture that is 51 percent owned by Johnson.

References

External links

Canyon-Johnson Funds

Companies based in Los Angeles County, California
Enterprises
Privately held companies based in California
Real estate companies of the United States